The Norrbottens Fotbollförbund (Norrbotten Football Association) is one of the 24 district organisations of the Swedish Football Association. It administers lower tier  football in Norrbotten County.

Background 

Norrbottens Fotbollförbund, commonly referred to as Norrbottens FF, is the governing body for football in the historical province of Norrbotten and the extended area that now constitutes Norrbotten County. The Association currently has 104 member clubs.  Based in Luleå, the Association's Chairman is Robert Lindström.

It was established on 29 April 1917.

Affiliated Members 

The following clubs are affiliated to the Norrbottens FF:

Aapua IF
Alterdalens IF
Alviks IK
Arjeplogs SK
Assi IF
Bergens IF
Bergnäsets AIK
Blåsmarks SK
Bodens BK FF
Bölebyn SK
Brändöns IF
Brännbergs IF
Bredåkers SK
Ersnäs IF
Gällivare Malmbergets FF
Gällivare SK
Gammelgårdens IF
Gammelstads IF
Glommersträsk-Lappträsk IF
Gunnarsby SK
Hakkas GOIF
Haparanda FF
Harads IF
Hedens IF
Hemmingsmarks IF
Hertsö SK
IF Luleå
IF Polcirkeln
IFK Arvidsjaur DFK
IFK Arvidsjaur FK
IFK Kalix
IFK Luleå
IFK Råneå
IFK Tärendö
Infjärdens SK
Jävre IF
Jokkmokks SK
Junosuando IK
Kainulasjärvi SK
Kalix DFF
Kärrbäck SK
Kaunisvaara IF
Kiruna FF
Korpilombolo GOIF
Korsträsk IK
Koskullskulle AIF
Lillpite IF
Lira Bollklubb
Luleå Damfotboll FC
Luleå FC
Luleå FF
Luleå Fotboll BoIS
Luleå SK
Malmbergets AIF
Moskosels IF
Munksund-Skuthamns SK
Niilivaara IS
Nikkala IK
Norrfjärdens IF
Notvikens IK
Nyborgs SK
Nybyns IK
Ohtana/Aapua FF
Ohtanajärvi IK
Påboda SK
Pajala IF
Pålänge GIF
Parkalompolo IK
Pello IF
Piteå FF
Piteå IF
Polcirkeln/Svanstein FF
Rosvik IK
Rutviks SK
Sangis AIF
Sävast AIF
Seskarö IF
Sikfors SK
Sjulsmarks SK
Skogså IF
Storfors AIK
Storfors Arbetares IF
Sunderby SK
Sundoms IF
Svansteins SK
Svappavaara AIF
Svartbjörnsbyns IF
Svartlå IK
Svensby SK
Töre SK
Trångfors IF
Tväråselets AIF
Ullatti IF
Unbyns IF
Vidsels IK
Vistträsk IF
Vitå BK
Vittangi SK
Vittjärvs IK
Vuollerims SK
Älvsby IF
Öjeby IF
Överkalix IF
Övertorneå SK

League Competitions 
Norrbottens FF run the following League Competitions:

Men's Football
Division 4  -  two sections
Division 5  -  two sections
Division 6  -  three sections

Women's Football
Division 3  -  one section
Division 4  -  two sections

Footnotes

External links 
 Norrbottens FF Official Website 

Norrbottens
Football in Norrbotten County
1917 establishments in Sweden
Organizations established in 1917